Emy Freifrau von Stetten (6 April 1898 – 22 February 1980) was a German oratorio, opera and Lied soprano and music teacher at the Frankfurt University of Music and Performing Arts.

Life 
Born  in Königsberg, Emilie Brode was a daughter of Ellida Wittich and Max Brode, the founder and conductor of the Königsberg Symphony Orchestra. Until her divorce in 1948, she was married  to the Austrian painter Norbert von Stetten. The marriage produced two daughters, Ellida (1919-2008) and Brigitte (b. 1920).

During the National Socialist era, she was banned from performing as a "half-Jew", although she emphasised her own National Socialist sentiments and her husband's party membership, and was only given special permits to work as a music teacher. In Herbert Gerigk's and Theophil Stengel's Lexikon der Juden in der Musik her name already appeared in the first edition (1940).

References

Further reading 
 Hannes Heer, Jürgen Kesting, Peter Schmidt: Verstummte Stimmen: die Bayreuther Festspiele und die "Juden" 1876 bis 1945. Eine Ausstellung. Festspielpark Bayreuth und Ausstellungshalle Neues Rathaus Bayreuth, 22. Juli bis 14. Oktober 2012. Metropol, Berlin 2012, 
 Karl-Josef Kutsch, Leo Riemens: Großes Sängerlexikon. Dritte, erweiterte und aktualisierte Auflage. Berlin 2000,

External links 
 Stetten Emmy von on operissimo

Academic staff of the Frankfurt University of Music and Performing Arts
German operatic sopranos
Musicians from Königsberg

1898 births

1980 deaths